The Ducktators is a 1942 Warner Bros. Looney Tunes short directed by Norman McCabe. The short was released on August 1, 1942, and satirizes events of World War II. The title is a pun on dictator.

Plot
A pair of farm ducks anticipate the hatching of their duckling from an unusually black-colored egg. A white duckling with a toothbrush mustache, Adolf Hitler, emerges from the egg and immediately shouts "Sieg Heil!" while giving the Nazi salute. Hitler's adulthood is spent giving aggressive speeches toward the other ducks and geese. His only ally is a large black Neapolitan-accented goose, Benito Mussolini, who promotes his own warmongering rhetoric to a solitary chick who is forced to attend and applaud.

Hitler's stormtroopers surround the farm while a Dove of Peace, observing from above, weeps in anticipation of the upcoming violence. A peace conference is held between the ducks and geese, but the unstable Hitler puts the peace treaty through a paper shredder and instigates a furious brawl. Meanwhile, an odd Japanese duck, Hideki Tojo, travels to the farm to support Hitler and Mussolini and "to make a silly Axis of himself". During his voyage across the sea, he absentmindedly plants a sign reading "Japanese Mandate Island" on a turtle's back. When the turtle emerges, sees what has been placed on his shell and subsequently attacks Tojo, this 'Ducktator' vainly attempts to pass himself off as Chinese. The turtle sarcastically replies that he is mock turtle soup and continues attacking Tojo.

With their troops, Hitler, Mussolini and Tojo set out toward their planned conquest of the farm. The Dove attempts to reason with them, but they ignore and trample him. The Dove violently retaliates and saves the day with the aid of many chickens, and the (somehow) rescued baby chick, and a rabbit that is a send-up of Jerry Colonna (possibly a caricature of Joseph Stalin) as Hitler, Benito, and Hideki run for their lives and a Minuteman promptly emerges from a poster that says "For Victory, Buy United States Victory Bonds" and fires his musket at the fleeing trio. The Dove is then seen relating the tale to his two children, Peace and Quiet, while proudly displaying the battered heads of his enemies as trophies mounted above his fireplace. A final message invites the audience to express their patriotism by buying state bonds.

Political references
The duckling that hatched from the egg had a mustache and a Nazi emblem throughout the cartoon, indicating that this character symbolized Adolf Hitler. The goose who became a comrade to the duck had an open Italian accent and, at the end of one of his speeches, a chick  can be heard yelling "Duce!" multiple times, indicating that this goose is Benito Mussolini. The second duck utilized the flag of the Empire of Japan, and openly sang "The Japanese Sandman". He is presumably intended to be Hideki Tojo, judging by the military hat he is wearing. However, he is commonly misidentified as Hirohito. The black duck may be a reference to Rommel as he was also from South Germany and spoke with an accent, but can also relate to how African Americans were a huge demographic in the Southern United States at the time.

Changes in Sunset Productions version
The ending which has the dove is sitting with his kids and pointing out that his enemies have been defeated (and are now heads mounted above the fireplace), followed by a notice to buy war bonds, has been rarely seen since the short was sold to Sunset Productions in the 1950s and syndicated through them (as Guild Films). As the cartoon is in the public domain, this edited version has frequently been found on VHS and DVD home video collections. However, on the Looney Tunes Golden Collection: Volume 6 DVD set and the World War II cartoons special on the Cartoon Network show ToonHeads, the full ending is shown uncut and uncensored.

Reception
The Film Daily called the short "Acceptable", saying, "Hitler, Mussolini and Hirohito are taken for a ride — a one-way ride — in this animated cartoon, which produces many laughs at their expense."

Home media
Due to the short's World War II stereotypes, it has rarely been shown on American television, except for Cartoon Network as part of its anthology television show, ToonHeads. The Ducktators is available uncut on Looney Tunes Golden Collection: Volume 6, Disc 2.

See also
 List of World War II short films
 List of films in the public domain in the United States

References

External links
 
 

1942 films
1942 short films
1942 animated films
1940s animated short films
1940s English-language films
1940s Warner Bros. animated short films
American black-and-white films
American World War II propaganda shorts
World War II films made in wartime
Looney Tunes shorts
Ethnic humour
Stereotypes of East Asian people
Japan in non-Japanese culture
Films about real people
Animation based on real people
Cultural depictions of Adolf Hitler
Cultural depictions of Benito Mussolini
Cultural depictions of Hideki Tojo
Animated films about chickens
Animated films about ducks
Fictional geese
Films about fascism
Films set in 1942
Films directed by Norman McCabe
Films produced by Leon Schlesinger
Films scored by Carl Stalling
Warner Bros. Cartoons animated short films